The men's 800 metres event at the 1948 Olympic Games took place July 30, July 31 and August 2. Forty-one athletes from 24 nations competed. The maximum number of athletes per nation had been set at 3 since the 1930 Olympic Congress. The final was won by the American Mal Whitfield. It was the first of Whitfield's two wins in the event, the second of four consecutive American victories, and the fifth overall United States win in the 800 metres. Arthur Wint earned Jamaica's first Olympic medal in any event with silver; he would take gold in the 400 metres a few days later. Marcel Hansenne took France's first 800 metres medal with bronze.

Summary
The competitors all started from a crouch start. In the final, Marcel Hansenne bolted from the blocks to take the lead. The tall Arthur Wint worked his way through the crowd and moved into the marking position by the end of the turn. Mal Whitfield smoothly ran around the crowd, past Wint and Hansenne into the lead. Whitfield kept going, extending his lead to five metres uncontested. Ingvar Bengtsson moved forward to challenge Hansenne, holding the edge through the final turn. Coming off the final turn, Wint ran around both of them and set off in chase of Whitfield. He was able to close down a couple of meters but the gap was too much, Whitfield winning easily. Behind them, Herb Barten ran around the outside of Bengtsson and challenged Hansenne to the line, but Hansenne took the bronze.

Background

This was the 11th appearance of the event, which is one of 12 athletics events to have been held at every Summer Olympics. None of the finalists from the pre-war 1936 Games returned. Noted contenders included Mal Whitfield of the United States, Arthur Wint of Jamaica, Doug Harris of New Zealand, and Marcel Hansenne of France.

Egypt, Iceland, Jamaica, South Korea, and Trinidad and Tobago appeared in the event for the first time. Great Britain and the United States each made their 10th appearance, tied for the most among all nations.

Competition format

The event used the three-round format introduced in 1912. There were six first-round heats, each with 7 and 8 athletes (before withdrawals); the top four runners in each heat advanced to the semifinals. There were three semifinals with 8 athletes each; the top three runners in each semifinal advanced to the nine-man final.

Records

These were the standing world and Olympic records (in minutes) prior to the 1948 Summer Olympics.

Mal Whitfield broke the Olympic record with a time of 1:49.2 in the final.

Schedule
All times are British Summer Time (UTC+1).

Results

Round 1

The first four in each heat qualified for the semifinals.

Heat 1

Heat 2

Heat 3

Heat 4

Heat 5

Heat 6

Semifinals

Semifinal 1

Semifinal 2

Semifinal 3

Final

References

Athletics at the 1948 Summer Olympics
800 metres at the Olympics
Men's events at the 1948 Summer Olympics